Via Cavour may refer to several streets in Italy:

Via Cavour, Florence
Via Cavour, Palermo
Via Cavour, Rome
Via Cavour, Turin, see University of Turin

See also
 Cavour (disambiguation)